Edward Peyton was a Royal Navy officer.

Edward Peyton may also refer to:

Sir Edward Peyton, 2nd Baronet (died 1657), English landowner and politician
Edward Peyton (MP), member of parliament for Maldon